En with hook (Ӈ ӈ; italics: Ӈ ӈ) is a letter of the Cyrillic script. Its form is derived from the Cyrillic letter En (Н н) by adding a hook to the right leg.

Usage
En with hook is used in the alphabets of a number of languages of Russia, including all the Chukotko-Kamchatkan and Samoyedic languages:

Chukotko-Kamchatkan languages
Chukchi
Koryak
Kerek
Alyutor
Itelmen

Uralic languages

Samoyedic languages
Enets
Tundra Nenets
Forest Nenets
Nganasan
Selkup

Other Uralic languages
Kildin Sami
Khanty
Mansi

Tungusic languages
Even
Evenki
Nanai
Negidal
Oroch
Orok
Udege
Ulch

Eskimo–Aleut languages
Aleut
Chaplino dialect

Other languages
Ket
Nivkh

Computing codes

See also
Ң ң : Cyrillic letter En with descender
Ӊ ӊ : Cyrillic letter En with tail
Ҥ ҥ : Cyrillic ligature En Ge
Ԩ ԩ : Cyrillic letter En with left hook
Ŋ ŋ : Latin letter Eng
Ꜧ ꜧ : Latin letter Heng
Cyrillic characters in Unicode

Cyrillic letters with diacritics
Letters with hook